Cryptothecia is a genus of white to greenish crustose lichens that grow on bark, wood, or leaves. in tropical or subtropical areas worldwide. It has a conspicuous prothallus that develops around its periphery which can be bright red in some species, hence the common name wreath lichen. The main vegetative body (thallus) lacks a cortex (ecorticate and is often immersed in the substrate or byssoid (whispy, like teased wool). The medulla is white, well defined, and often peppered with calcium oxalate crystals. Ascomata are not well defined, being cushions of soft white mycelium immersed in the medullary tissue, hence the name from the Greek krypto = "to conceal" and theke = "a container or sheath". There are about 45 described species in the genus according to one source, and 75 species according to another. The genus is in the family Arthoniaceae. It contains Trentepohlia, a green alga, as its photobiont partner.

Two species have been described in North America. At least one species, Cryptothecia rubrocincta, has been used in Brazil as a source of dye.

Species
Cryptothecia alboglauca  – India
Cryptothecia albomaculans 
Cryptothecia albomaculatella  – Thailand
Cryptothecia aleurinoides  – Thailand
Cryptothecia atropunctata 
Cryptothecia austrocoreana 
Cryptothecia bengalensis  – India
Cryptothecia calusarum  – USA
Cryptothecia chamelensis  – Mexico
Cryptothecia darwiniana  – Galápagos Islands
Cryptothecia duplofluorescens  – Brazil
Cryptothecia elata 
Cryptothecia elongata 
Cryptothecia eungellae 
Cryptothecia evergladensis 
Cryptothecia exilis 
Cryptothecia fabispora  – Brazil
Cryptothecia farinosa  – India
Cryptothecia fuscopunctata 
Cryptothecia galapagoana  – Galápagos Islands
Cryptothecia inexspectata 
Cryptothecia isidioxantha 
Cryptothecia lichexanthonica  – Brazil
Cryptothecia macrocephala  – Brazil
Cryptothecia methylmicrophyllinica 
Cryptothecia multipunctata  – India
Cryptothecia odishensis  – India
Cryptothecia punctosorediata 
Cryptothecia randallii  – USA
Cryptothecia rhizophora  – Brazil
Cryptothecia rosae-iselae  – Bolivia
Cryptothecia scripta 
Cryptothecia stockerae  – Seychelles
Cryptothecia submacrocephala  – USA
Cryptothecia subnidulans 
Cryptothecia superphyllinica 
Cryptothecia verruculifera  – India

References

Further reading
 U.Makhija & P.G.Patwardhan, A contribution towards a monograph of the lichen genus Cryptothecia (family Arthoniaceae), Current Res. Pl. Sci. 1994: 57–72 (1994)
 R.Lücking, G.Thor, A.Aptroot, K.Kalb & J.A.Elix, The Cryptothecia candida complex revisited, Lichenologist 38: 235–240 (2006).

 
Arthoniomycetes genera
Lichen genera
Taxa described in 1876
Taxa named by James Stirton